The WAGGGS Europe Region is the regional office of the World Association of Girl Guides and Girl Scouts, which supports Girl Guiding and Girl Scouting in Europe, including the former Soviet Republics of Armenia, Azerbaijan, Belarus, Georgia, Moldova, Russia, and Ukraine, as well as Cyprus  and Israel.

History
All the formerly communist states of Central and Eastern Europe and the Soviet Union have developed or are developing Guiding in the wake of the renaissance in the region. These include Albania, Bulgaria, East Germany, Hungary, Poland, Romania, and the successor states to Czechoslovakia, Yugoslavia and the Baltic nations independent of the former Soviet Union. Of these, Poland, the Czech Republic and Hungary have been most successful in regrowing their Guide movements and are very well-developed, thanks in part to the existence of Guides-in-Exile movements for the diaspora of each nation.

This region is the counterpart of the European Region of the World Organization of the Scout Movement (WOSM). The Europe Region WAGGGS has strong connections to the European Region of WOSM. Both maintained a joined office in Brussels for some years and published a monthly newsletter called Eurofax.

There is no WAGGGS Region corresponding to the World Organization of the Scout Movement Eurasian Region; postSoviet nations are divided between the WAGGGS-Europe Region and the WAGGGS-Asia Pacific Region.

See also

equivalent regions in WOSM -
 European Scout Region (World Organization of the Scout Movement), Western Europe
 Eurasian Scout Region (World Organization of the Scout Movement), (former Soviet) Eastern Europe

References

External links
 
 WEConnect - Joint Communication Platform of the Europe Region WAGGGS and the European Scout Region

World Association of Girl Guides and Girl Scouts